Gaoqiao Town is a town in Changsha County, Changsha, Hunan Province, China. It administers one community and ten villages.

Divisions of Changsha County
Changsha County